Sphaerostylis is a genus of plant of the family Euphorbiaceae first described as a genus in 1858. The entire genus is endemic to Madagascar.

Species
 Sphaerostylis perrieri Leandri
 Sphaerostylis tulasneana Baill.

Formerly included
moved to other genera (Megistostigma Tragiella )
 Sphaerostylis anomala - Tragiella anomala 
 Sphaerostylis cordata - Megistostigma cordatum 
 Sphaerostylis frieseana - Tragiella frieseana
 Sphaerostylis glabrata - Megistostigma glabratum 
 Sphaerostylis malaccensis - Megistostigma glabratum 
 Sphaerostylis natalensis - Tragiella natalensis

References

Euphorbiaceae genera
Plukenetieae
Endemic flora of Madagascar
Taxa named by Henri Ernest Baillon